Pumlumon Fach is a top of Pen Pumlumon Fawr on the Plynlimon massif, a part of the Cambrian Mountains in the county of Ceredigion, Wales. It lies on small ridge heading north-west from the summit of Pen Pumlumon Fawr.

The summit is marked by small cairn, and overlooks the Nant-y-moch Reservoir to the north and Llyn Llygad Rheidiol to the east. The views also include the smaller summits of Drosgol (550m) and Banc Llechwedd-mawr (560m) and Cwm Hyddgen, a hide out of Owain Glyndŵr and his army.

References

External links
 www.geograph.co.uk ; photos of Plynlimon and surrounding area

Mountains and hills of Ceredigion
Hewitts of Wales
Nuttalls
Elenydd